Flat Rock is a historic plantation house located near Kenbridge, Lunenburg County, Virginia. The house was built in several sections during the first half of the 19th century. It is a two-story, three-bay frame structure flanked by one-story, one-bay wings. The oldest portion likely dates to about 1797. It has a side-gable roof and features two massive exterior end chimneys of brick and granite. Also on the property are the contributing smokehouse and a mid-19th-century monument to Henry H. Chambers (1790–1826), son of an owner of Flat Rock and later a U.S. Senator from Alabama, who is buried here where he died en route to Washington.

It was listed on the National Register of Historic Places in 1979.

References

Plantation houses in Virginia
Houses on the National Register of Historic Places in Virginia
Houses completed in 1797
Houses in Lunenburg County, Virginia
National Register of Historic Places in Lunenburg County, Virginia